This is a list of highly notable practitioners of Taekwondo.

Grandmasters

Choi H.H and Original Twelve Masters of Taekwondo

 Choi Hong-hi (Chung Do Kwan → Oh Do Kwan → KTA → ITF) – Founder of International Taekwon-Do Federation. While contested, Choi is still regarded by many as the "Founder of Taekwon-Do".

 Nam Tae-hi (Chung Do Kwan → ITF) – was a pioneering South Korean master of taekwondo and is known as the "Father of Vietnamese Taekwondo". With Choi Hong-hi, he co-founded the "Oh Do Kwan" and led the twelve original masters of taekwondo of the Korea Taekwon-Do Association (KTA).

 Choi Chang-keun (ITF) – began his martial arts training in the South Korean army in 1956, studying taekwondo and karate. Choi taught taekwondo in Malaysia from 1964, and moved to Vancouver, Canada, in 1970. In 1973, he held the rank of 7th dan. Choi was promoted to 8th dan in 1981 by H. H. Choi, and attained the rank of 9th dan in 2002. He is still based in Vancouver.

 Choi Kwang-jo (other/Choi Kwang Do) – Following a career in the South Korean military, he emigrated to the United States of America in 1970. Choi is the founder and head of the Choi Kwang Do international martial art organization, with headquarters in Atlanta, Georgia, USA.
 Han Cha-kyo (Oh Do Kwan → ITF → UTF) – Following a career in the South Korean military, he emigrated to the United States of America in 1971 with his wife and newborn daughter. After teaching taekwondo for many years in Chicago, he died in 1996.

 Kim Jong-chan (ITF) – based in Vancouver, Canada.

 Kim Kwang-il (ITF) – contributed to the introduction of taekwondo into West Germany. He was head instructor of the ITF in West Germany, but was relieved of this duty in October 1971. In 1975, Kim was ranked 6th dan. He promoted Rolf Becking, head of the ITF Germany Technical Committee, to the rank of 2nd dan in 1976 in Stuttgart, West Germany. Between 1974 and 1977 Kim had a restaurant in Stuttgart and had completed training as a Brewmeister prior to 1974.

 Kong Young-il (ITF) – Following a career in the South Korean military, Kong emigrated to the United States of America just before or in 1968. He and his younger brother, Young-bo Kong, founded the Young Brothers Taekwondo Associates in 1968. Kong was promoted to the rank of 9th dan in 1997 by H. H. Choi in Poland. He is based in Las Vegas.

 Park Jong-soo (ITF) – In 1968, Park settled in Toronto, Canada. In 1973, he held the rank of 7th dan. Park and Choi went their separate ways after Choi insisted on establishing relations with North Korea during a politically sensitive period.

 Park Jung-tae (ITF → GTF) – Park moved to Toronto, Canada in 1970. During the 1970s, Park established the Manitoba Tae Kwon-Do Association. In 1975, he was ranked 6th dan. At the time, he was ranked 8th dan in the ITF and in November 1984, Park was elected Secretary-General of the ITF. He also held the position of Technical Chairman of the ITF. Park founded the Global Taekwondo Federation (GTF) on 14 June 1990, the year after his departure from the ITF due to North–South Korean political issues. He created six additional hyung to be practised along with the earlier ITF patterns. Amongst those who affiliated with the GTF was Sabree Salleh in 1998. Shortly before he died, Park promoted Salleh to 9th dan (GTF).

 Park Sun-jae alias S.J. Park (ITF → WT) – a pioneer of taekwondo in Italy. He introduced taekwondo to Italy around 1968. In 1968, he was ranked 5th dan, and in 1975, he was ranked 7th dan. He was elected vice-president (Italy) in the European Tae Kwon Do Union (within the World Taekwondo Federation) at the union's inaugural meeting in 1976. In 2002, he was a member of the arbitration board for the WT's World Cup Taekwondo championship in Tokyo. On 15 February 2004, the Executive Council of the WT elected him as Acting President of the WT following Un-yong Kim's resignation from the presidency of the organisation. He is Vice President (Italy) of the WT. Park was President of the Federazione Italiana Taekwondo (Italian Taekwondo Federation) around 1998, and still held the position as of 2008 and 2009.

 Chong-chul Rhee (KTA → Rhee Taekwondo) – South Korean master of taekwondo who arrived to Australia in the 1960s. He is the founder of Rhee Taekwon-Do, which is widely publicised as Australia's first and biggest taekwondo school. Rhee holds the title 'World Master' and the rank of 8th dan in taekwondo.

 Rhee Chong-hyup alias C.H Rhee (KTA → Rhee Taekwondo)– In the mid-1960s, he contributed to the introduction of taekwondo to Malaysia and Singapore. He arrived in Australia in 1970 and settled in Melbourne, Australia. Rhee is in charge of Rhee Taekwon-Do operations in Melbourne.

 Rhee Ki-ha (ITF) – widely recognised as the 'Father of British Taekwon-Do' for introducing the martial art to the United Kingdom since arriving in 1967. He is also considered the 'Father of Irish Taekwon-Do'.

Other notable grandmasters
 Sun-hwan Chung alias James Sun-hwan Chung (WT → Moo Sool Do) – one of the highest-ranking Tang Soo Do, Hapkido, and taekwondo grandmasters in the world.   He is founder of the Moo Sool Do (Martial Arts United) form of martial arts and is president of the World Academy of Martial Arts, LLC.
 Kim Ki-whang (WT)
 Sang-chul Lee (WT)
 Hong Sung-chon (WT, 9th Dan) – is an early proponent of Taekwondo in the Philippines. He is the vice-president of the Philippine Taekwondo Association. 
 Sang-kee Paik (WT)
 Park Dong-keun (WT)
 Park Yeon-hwan (WT)
 Tae-hong Choi (WT)
 Brenda Sell (WT)
 Choi Jung-hwa (ITF)
 Robert Howard (martial artist) (ITF)
 Frank Massar (ITF)
 Tran Trieu Quan (ITF)
 Nguyễn Văn Bình (judoka) (ITF)
 Haeng Ung Lee (ATA)
 Kwang Sung Hwang (ITF → KATU)
 Kyongwon Ahn (WT → UTA)
 Jhoon Rhee (Chung Do Kwan → ITF → Jhoon Rhee TKD) – South Korean master of taekwondo who is widely recognized as the 'Father of American Taekwondo' for introducing this martial art to the United States of America since arriving in the 1950s. He was ranked 10th dan.
 S. Henry Cho (other)
 Hee Il Cho (other)
 Kim Pyung-soo (other)
 Hwang Jang-Lee (other)

Olympic medalists
All the practitioners listed in this section are part of World Taekwondo.
 Hadi Saei – Iranian councilor and former taekwondo athlete who became the most successful Iranian athlete in Olympic history and the most titled champion in this sport by winning 9 world class titles (three olympic titles in 2000 and 2004 and 2008, two world championships titles, four world cup titles and one world olympic qualification tournament).
 Yousef Karami
 Steven López
 Hwang Kyung-seon
 Chen Zhong
 Wu Jingyu 
 Jade Jones,  – Welsh taekwondo athlete. She is the 2012 and 2016 Olympic gold medallist in the women's 57 kg category, and the 2019 World champion, 2016, 2018 and 2021 European champion and 2015 European Games champion at the same weight. In 2012, she won Britain's first taekwondo Olympic gold medal in this category. Jones was at the time the reigning Youth Olympic champion in the girls' 55 kg category, winning gold for Great Britain in 2010.
 María Espinoza 	
 Chu Mu-yen
 Servet Tazegül 	
 Cha Dong-min
 Joel González
 Alexandros Nikolaidis
 Huang Chih-hsiung
 Mauro Sarmiento
 Lee Dae-hoon
 Nur Tatar	
 Pascal Gentil 
 Rohullah Nikpai
 Milica Mandić
 Alexey Denisenko 
 Maksim Khramtsov
 Vladislav Larin
 Beth Munro

Kickboxers and Mixed Martial Artists
 Anthony Pettis – is a 3rd dan black belt in Taekwondo
 Yair Rodríguez
 Anderson Silva 
 Mirko Filipović (alias Cro Cop) -  Filipović began formal training in taekwondo at the age of 7.
 Rose Namajunas
 Valentina Shevchenko
 Bas Rutten
 Edson Barboza
 Benson Henderson
 Akop Stepanyan
 Nina Ansaroff
 Keiji Ozaki
 Yuta Kubo
 Dale Cook
 Uriah Hall
 Jung Chan-sung (alias The Korean Zombie) – started training in Taekwondo when he was in the South Korean Navy. 
 Conor McGregor 
 Dennis Siver
 Mayhem Miller
 Michael Page – Page describes his discipline as a "hands down kickboxing style" created from a "mishmash" of taekwondo, karate, and kung fu styles competing under a points scoring ruleset. Page was scouted by the Great Britain Taekwondo team to train and qualify for the Olympics but turned it down to pursue a professional combat sports career.
 Thanh Le - one time holder of ONE Featherweight World Championship. He has been training in Taekwondo since his infancy, as his father ran a Taekwondo Gym.

Celebrity practitioners
 Chuck Norris - while primarily known as Tang Soo Do practitioner, as well as having devised his own martial arts system, Norris was awarded 8th Dan Black Belt in Taekwondo in 1997 - being the first American to receive such honor.
 Michael Imperioli -  American actor, writer, director and musician, best known for his role as Christopher Moltisanti in the HBO crime drama The Sopranos (1999–2007). He and his family are avid practitioners of Taekwondo.
 Sarah Michelle Gellar
 Jessica Alba
 Criss Angel
 Phil Mickelson
 D'Brickashaw Ferguson -  former American football offensive tackle who played ten seasons for the New York Jets of the National Football League (NFL). He is a brown belt in taekwondo.
 Dave Mustaine -  American musician. He is the co-founder, lead vocalist, rhythm guitarist and primary songwriter of the thrash metal band Megadeth. Mustaine holds a black belt in taekwondo and was made a Goodwill Ambassador of the World by the World Taekwondo Federation in 2007.
 Eric Roberts
 Michael Jai White - has studied various martial arts, including Taekwondo.
 Joe Rogan - According to Black Belt Magazine, Rogan started competing in taekwondo tournaments at 15 and claimed his U.S. Open title four years later.
 Katheryn Winnick
 Sean Patrick Flanery
 Rick Yune
 Evan Rachel Wood
 Willie Nelson
 Ryan Phillippe
 Lorenzo Lamas
 Emmanuel Lewis
 Mackenzie Foy
 Noah Ringer
 Jerry Trimble
 Young Kun Kim (alias Y.K Kim) – received a taekwondo black belt at age 13, making him among the youngest in Korea to do so. At first he studied and taught taekwondo in Korea. In 1976 he moved to Buenos Aires, Argentina and taught taekwondo there. In 1977 he moved to New York City. In 1978 he moved to Orlando, Florida and opened Y.K. Kim's TaeKwon-Do, his first taekwondo school. Known also for the 1987 cult movie Miami Connection, which Y.K Kim produced and starred in.
 Phillip Rhee -  South Korean-American martial artist, actor, director, screenwriter, and film producer, most famous for his role in the Best of the Best movie series. While primarily known as a Hapkido practitioner, he also holds a black belt in Taekwondo.
 Simon Rhee
 Gary Daniels
 Scott Adkins
 Dick Wei
 Donnie Yen
 Adrian Paul
 Brenda Song
 Akshay Kumar - obtained a black belt in Taekwondo while in India.
 Ariel Winter
 Tiger Shroff

Honorary Black belts
 Barack Obama – studied taekwondo from 2001 to 2005, when he served as a junior senator in Illinois. In 2009 Obama was awarded honorary black belt by then-South Korean President Lee Myung-Bak.
 Arnold Schwarzenegger
 Vladimir Putin (WT) – Was awarded 9th Degree Black Belt by World Taekwondo in 2013. World Taekwondo stripped Putin's Honorary belt after the instigation of the 2022 Russian invasion of Ukraine.
 Donald Trump (WT) – was presented with the honor by Lee Dong Seop, the president of Kukkiwon, on November 22, 2021. This event drew public derision, due to Trump's general negative image and his generally perceived lack of fitness required for the martial art.
 Zlatan Ibrahimovic – was awarded an honorary black belt in 2010.

References

Taekwondo practitioners
Taekwondo
Lists of martial artists